Charles "Charlie" Brown is the principal character of the comic strip Peanuts, syndicated in daily and Sunday newspapers in numerous countries all over the world. Depicted as a "lovable loser," Charlie Brown is one of the great American archetypes and a popular and widely recognized cartoon character. Charlie Brown is characterized as a person who frequently suffers, and as a result, is usually nervous and lacks self-confidence. He shows both pessimistic and optimistic attitudes: on some days, he is apprehensive to even go outside because his day might just be spoiled, but on others, he hopes for the best and tries as much as he can to accomplish things. He is easily recognized by his trademark zigzag patterned shirt.

The character's creator, Charles M. Schulz, said that Charlie Brown "must be the one who suffers because he is a caricature of the average person. Most of us are much more acquainted with losing than winning." Despite this, Charlie Brown does not always suffer, as he has experienced some happy moments and victories through the years, and he has sometimes uncharacteristically shown self-assertiveness despite his frequent nervousness. Schulz also said: "I like to have Charlie Brown eventually be the focal point of almost every story." Charlie Brown is the only Peanuts character to have appeared regularly in the strip throughout its entire 50-year run.

Lee Mendelson, producer of the majority of the Peanuts television specials, has said of Charlie Brown that "He was, and is, the ultimate survivor in overcoming bulliness—Lucy or otherwise."

Charlie Brown's age is neither normally specified nor consistently given. His birthday occurs in the strip published on October 30, 1950. He is four years old in a strip published November 3, 1950. He ages very slowly in the strip's floating timeline, eventually settling at around eight years old. A strip published on April 3, 1971, suggests he was born around 1963 (setting up the gag that when he is 21, it will be 1984). Initially, Charlie Brown suggests he lives in an apartment, with his grandmother occupying the one above his; a few years into the strip, he moves to a house with a backyard.

History

1940s–1950s 

The character's name was first used on May 30, 1948, in an early Schulz comic strip called Li'l Folks, in which one boy has buried another in a sandbox and then denies that he has seen the other boy ("Charlie Brown") when asked. The character made his official debut in the first Peanuts comic strip on October 2, 1950. The strip features Charlie Brown walking by, as two other children named Shermy and Patty look at him. Shermy refers to him as "Good Ol' Charlie Brown" as he passes by, but then immediately reveals his hatred toward him once he is gone on the last panel. During the strip's early years, Charlie Brown was much more lighthearted and impish and not the dour defeatist he would soon become. He was something of a smart-aleck and frequently played pranks and jokes on the other characters.  His signature zig-zag pattern first appeared on his formerly plain T-shirt on December 21, 1950. By April 25, 1952, his T-shirt was changed to a polo shirt with a collar and the zig-zag. On the March 6, 1951, strip, Charlie Brown first appears to play baseball, as he was warming up before telling Shermy that they can start the game; however, he was the catcher, not yet the pitcher.

Charlie Brown's relationships with other Peanuts characters initially differed significantly from their later states, and their concepts were grown up through this decade until they reached their more-established forms. An example is his relationship with Violet Gray, to whom he was introduced in the February 7, 1951, strip. The two constantly remained on fairly good terms, a bit different from their later somewhat tepid relationship. In the August 16, 1951, strip, she called Charlie Brown a "blockhead", being the first time Charlie Brown was referred by that insult. The strip for November 14 of that year featured the first appearance of the famous football gag, with Violet in the role that would later be filled by Lucy.

Charlie Brown is introduced to Schroeder on May 30, 1951. As Schroeder is still a baby, Charlie Brown cannot converse with him. On June 1 of the same year, Charlie Brown stated that he felt like a father to Schroeder; in fact, for quite some time, he sometimes acted like a father to him, trying to teach him words and reading stories to him. On September 24 of that year, he taught Schroeder how to play the piano, the instrument which would later become Schroeder's trademark. On that year's October 10, strip, he told Schroeder the story of Beethoven and set the piano player's obsession with the composer. Charlie Brown placed the Beethoven bust on Schroeder's piano on November 26, 1951. Later, Schroeder and Charlie Brown were portrayed as being about the same age, and Schroeder became Charlie Brown's closest friend after Linus Van Pelt.  Schroeder became the  catcher on Charlie Brown's baseball team for the first time in the April 12, 1952, strip.

In early 1959, Charlie Brown (and other Peanuts characters) made his first animated appearances after they were sponsored by the Ford Motor Company in commercials for its automobiles, as well as for intros to The Tennessee Ernie Ford Show. The ads were animated by Bill Melendez for Playhouse Pictures, a cartoon studio that had Ford as a client.

1960s 
In the 1960s, the Peanuts comic strip entered what most readers consider to be its Golden Age, and Charlie Brown reaching his peak in popularity, becoming well-known in numerous countries, with the strip reaching 355 million readers.

In 1965, the Coca-Cola Company approached Mendelson about sponsoring a Peanuts Christmas television special. The next day Mendelson called Schulz and said they were making a Christmas special featuring Charlie Brown and the Peanuts characters, in which he collaborated with both Schulz and Melendez. Titled A Charlie Brown Christmas, it was first broadcast by the CBS network on December 9, 1965. The special's primary goal is showing "the true meaning of Christmas". Before A Charlie Brown Christmas was broadcast, several of those involved in the special's creation were worried that it might be poorly received, with its unorthodox soundtrack and overt religious message; however, it turned out to be a huge success, with the number of homes watching the special an estimated 15,490,000, placing it at number two in the ratings, behind Bonanza on NBC. The special's music score made an equally pervasive impact on viewers who would later perform jazz, among them David Benoit and George Winston. A Charlie Brown Christmas  was honored with both an Emmy and Peabody Award.

The success of A Charlie Brown Christmas was followed by the creation of a second CBS television special starring Charlie Brown, Charlie Brown's All-Stars, which was shown on June 8, 1966. In October of that year, Charlie Brown appeared in a third Peanuts special: the Halloween-themed It's the Great Pumpkin, Charlie Brown.

The stage adaptation of a concept album titled You're a Good Man, Charlie Brown, based on Charlie Brown, Snoopy, Lucy, Linus, Schroeder, and Patty, went into rehearsal in New York City on February 10, 1967. Prior to its opening, the musical had no actual libretto; it was several vignettes with dialogue adapted from Peanuts strips and a musical number for each one. Since Patty was such a weakly defined character in Schulz's strip, she became a composite character in the musical, with much of her material taken from Violet and Frieda in the strip. On March 7, 1967, the musical premiered off-Broadway at Theatre 80 in the East Village, featuring Gary Burghoff as Charlie Brown.

On December 4, 1969, Charlie Brown starred on the first full-length animated feature based on Peanuts: A Boy Named Charlie Brown. The film was a box office success, gaining 6 million dollars in the box office out of its 1 million dollar budget, and was well received by critics.

Charlie Brown and his dog Snoopy reached new heights on May 18, 1969, when they became the names of the command module and lunar module, respectively, for Apollo 10. While not included in the official mission logo, Charlie Brown and Snoopy became semi-official mascots for the mission. Charles Schulz drew an original picture of Charlie Brown in a spacesuit; this drawing was hidden aboard the craft to be found by the astronauts once they were in orbit. Its current location is on a display at the Kennedy Space Center.

1970s 
For this decade, the character appeared on twelve Peanuts television specials that were produced as a result of the success of the prior ones. Charlie Brown also appeared on two full-length animations (Snoopy, Come Home and Race for Your Life, Charlie Brown, released respectively on August 9, 1972, and August 24, 1977).

1980s 
Charlie Brown went on to feature in fourteen more television specials, two of which are musicals (one of which is the animated version of You're A Good Man, Charlie Brown).

Charlie Brown starred once again in a full-length animation, which was titled Bon Voyage, Charlie Brown (and Don't Come Back!!) and released on May 30, 1980.

1990s 
Six television specials featuring Charlie Brown were produced during this decade.

Within the comic strip, a storyline got Charlie Brown the character Peggy Jean as a girlfriend; this relationship lasted for roughly nine years.

Final comic strip appearance 

Charlie Brown made his final comic strip appearance in the final original Peanuts strip, which was published on February 13, 2000—the day after Schulz's death. Fittingly, Charlie Brown was the only character to appear in both the first strip in 1950 and the last in 2000. Despite ending its original run in 2000, reruns of the comic strip are still published as of 2022.

Post-comic strip appearances 
After the comic strip ended, Charlie Brown continued to appear in more television specials. On November 20, 2006, the special He's a Bully, Charlie Brown beat a Madonna concert special with its 10 million views, although Peanuts was no longer in its heyday. As of 2016, the latest of Charlie Brown's original television appearances is Happiness Is a Warm Blanket, Charlie Brown, which came out on October 1, 2011.

The Peanuts Movie 

A computer-animated film starring Charlie Brown, The Peanuts Movie, was released on November 6, 2015. The film was directed by Steve Martino, produced by Blue Sky Studios, and distributed by 20th Century Fox. The director said of the character: "We've all been Charlie Brown at one point in our lives".

The film received largely positive reviews from critics and audiences alike, and grossed $246 million worldwide against its $99 million budget, making it a box office success.

Inspiration 
Charlie Brown's traits and experiences are inspired by those of Schulz, who admitted in interviews that he'd often felt shy and withdrawn in his life. In an interview on Charlie Rose in May 1997, Schulz observed: "I suppose there's a melancholy feeling in a lot of cartoonists, because cartooning, like all other humor, comes from bad things happening." Furthermore, both Charlie Brown's and Schulz's fathers were barbers and their mothers housewives. Charlie Brown's friends, such as Linus and Shermy, were named after good friends of Schulz, and Peppermint Patty was inspired by Patricia Swanson, one of Schulz's cousins on his mother's side. Schulz devised the character's name when he saw peppermint candies in his house. Even Charlie Brown's unrequited love for the Little Red-Haired Girl was inspired by Schulz's own love for Donna Mae Johnson, an Art Instruction Inc. accountant. When Schulz finally proposed to her in June 1950, shortly after he'd made his first contract with his syndicate, she turned him down and married another man.

Personality
Charlie Brown is a shy, meek, kind, innocent, gentle-hearted character with many anxieties.

Charlie Brown is normally referred to by his full name (with the exceptions of Peppermint Patty who calls him "Chuck", Marcie, Eudora, Violette and Emily who call him 'Charles', Peggy Jean who calls him "Brownie Charles", and Sally who calls him "Big Brother", though on extremely rare occasions, Lucy, Violet, Patty and Frieda did call him just "Charlie") and his usual catchphrase is "good grief".  Like Schulz, Charlie Brown is the son of a barber. The character is an example of "the great American un-success story" in that he fails in almost everything he does with an almost continuous streak of bad luck; but still keeps trying with huge efforts and work, resulting in either more losses or great victories. Some of these victories are hitting a game-winning home run off a pitch by a minor character named Royanne on a strip from 1993, and his victory over Joe Agate (another minor character) in a game of marbles on a strip from 1995. Although Charlie Brown is often unlucky within the strip's storylines, in some ways Charles M. Schulz created through the ever-persevering character "the most shining example of the American success story in the comic strip field."

Charlie Brown cares very deeply for his family and friends, even if he was maltreated by them. His care for his sister is shown on a strip from May 26, 1959, when he reacts to the birth of his sister Sally by exclaiming "A BABY SISTER?! I'M A FATHER! I mean my DAD's a father! I'm a brother! I have a baby sister! I'm a brother!" Two strips later, Charlie Brown continues the celebration of her birth by handing over chocolate cigars to his friends. When Charlie Brown was maltreated by his companions (most often Lucy, Violet and Patty), he does not usually take out his anger on them, but often retaliates and even manages to turn the tables. An example is a strip from 1951, which features Violet and Patty telling Charlie Brown that they are not going to invite him to their party, with Charlie Brown replying that he does not wish to go to their "dumb ol' party" anyway, leading the two girls to invite him.

Christopher Caldwell has stated that "What makes Charlie Brown such a rich character is that he's not purely a loser. The self-loathing that causes him so much anguish is decidedly not self-effacement. Charlie Brown is optimistic enough to think he can earn a sense of self-worth, and his willingness to do so by exposing himself to humiliations is the dramatic engine that drives the strip. The greatest of Charlie Brown's virtues is his resilience, which is to say his courage. Charlie Brown is ambitious. He manages the baseball team. He's the pitcher, not a scrub. He may be a loser, but he's, strangely, a leader at the same time. This makes his mood swings truly bipolar in their magnificence: he vacillates not between kinda happy and kinda unhappy, but between being a "hero" and being a "goat"."

Birthday and age
In the strip from November 3, 1950, Charlie Brown said that he was "only four years old". However, he aged over the next two decades, being six years old as of November 17, 1957, and "eight-and-a-half years old" by July 11, 1979. Later references continue to peg Charlie Brown as being approximately eight years old.

Voice actors

Peter Robbins (1963–1969)
Chris Inglis (1971)
Chad Webber (1972–1973)
Todd Barbee (1973–1974)
Duncan Watson (1975–1977)
Dylan Beach (1976)
Arrin Skelley (1977–1980)
Liam Martin (1978)
Michael Mandy (1980–1982)
Grant Wehr (1981)
Brad Kesten (1983–1985)
Michael Catalano (1983)
Brett Johnson (1984–1986)
Chad Allen (1986)
Sean Colling (1988)
Erin Chase (1988–1989)
Jason Riffle (1988)
Kaleb Henley (1990)
Phillip Shafran (1991)
Justin Shenkarow (1992)
Jamie E. Smith (1992)
Jimmy Guardino (1993)
Steven Hartman (1995–1997)
Quinn Beswick (2000)
Wesley Singerman (2002–2003)
Adam Taylor Gordon (2003)
Spencer Robert Scott (2006)
Alex Ferris (2008–2010)
Trenton Rogers (2011)
Noah Schnapp (2015)
Aiden Lewandowski (2016)
Gaston Scardovi-Mounier (2018–2019)
Ethan Pugiotto (2019–2022)
Tyler James Nathan (2021-present)
Etienne Kellici (2021)

Reception
Charlie Brown, along with Snoopy, was ranked eighth on TV Guide's 50 Greatest Cartoon Characters of All Time.

Shrine of the Eternals

Charlie Brown was inducted into the Baseball Reliquary's Shrine of the Eternals in 2017. Similar in concept to the National Baseball Hall of Fame, criteria for inclusion in the Shrine of the Eternals differs in that statistical achievement is not a primary consideration for induction, and fictional characters are eligible for induction. Charlie Brown was the first fictional character inducted to the Shrine.

References

Sources

External links

Comics characters introduced in 1950
Fictional baseball players
Fictional players of American football
Peanuts characters
Child characters in animated films
Child characters in comics
Child characters in musical theatre
Child characters in television
Male characters in animation
Male characters in comics
Child characters in animation

de:Die Peanuts#Charlie Brown